Lacon D. Stockton (1814 – June 9, 1860) was a justice of the Iowa Supreme Court from June 3, 1856, until his death on June 9, 1860, appointed from Des Moines County, Iowa, by Governor James W. Grimes.

Stockton was the first Iowa Supreme Court justice to die in office.

References

Justices of the Iowa Supreme Court